Muhammad Quli Qutb Shah (4 April 156511 January 1612) was the fifth sultan of the Qutb Shahi dynasty of Golkonda and founded the city of Hyderabad, in South-central India and built its architectural centerpiece, the Charminar. He was an able administrator and his reign is considered one of the high points of the Qutb Shahi dynasty. He ascended to the throne in 1580 at the age of 15 and ruled for 31 years.

Birth, early life and personal life

Muhammad Quli Qutub Shah was the third son of Ibrahim Quli Qutb Shah Wali and Hindu Mother Bhagirathi. He was an accomplished poet and wrote his poetry in Persian, Telugu and Urdu.<ref name="Schimmel" >{{cite book |first1=Annemarie |last1=Schimmel |title=Classical Urdu Literature from the Beginning to Iqbāl |publisher=Otto Harrassowitz |year=1975 |page=143}}</ref> As the first author in the Urdu language, he composed his verses in the Persian diwan style, and his poems consisted of verses relating to a single topic, gazal-i musalsal. Muhammad Quli's Kulliyat comprised 1800 pages, over half were gazals, qasidas on one hundred pages, while the rest contained over 300 pages of matnawi and marsiyas. 

City of Hyderabad
Muhammad Quli built the city of Hyderabad on the southern bank of the Musi River in 1591. He called architects from all around the world to lay out the city, which was built on a grid plan. He constructed Char Minar.

 Patronage of literature 
Quli Qutb Shah was a scholar of Arabic, Persian and Telugu languages. He wrote poetry in Urdu, Persian, and Telugu. His poetry has been compiled into a volume entitled "Kulliyat-e-Quli Qutub Shah." He had the distinction of being the first Saheb-e-dewan Urdu poet and is credited with introducing a new sensibility into prevailing genres of Persian/Urdu poetry.

Several notable physicians wrote Persian language books on Unani medicine during the reign of Muhammad Quli Qutb Shah. These included Mir Momin (Ikhtiyarat-i Qutub Shahi), Shamsuddin Ali Husain al-Jurjani (Tazkirat-i Kahhalin), Hakim Shamsuddin bin Nuruddin (Zubdat-ul Hukama), Abdullah Tabib (Tibb-i Farid), Taqiuddin Muhammad bin Sadruddin Ali (Mizan-ul Tabai'), Nizamuddin Ahmad Gilani (Majmu'a-i Hakim-ul mulk), and Ismai'l bin Ibrahim Tabrezi (Tazkirat-ul Hukama'').

Notes

References
 Sangaychay Mala by Gajanan Pole
 Prime Ministers of Qutubshhs by Sri Bhopal Rao
 
 
 Books on Muhammad Quli Qutb Shah
 Chopra, R.M., The Rise, Growth And Decline of Indo-Persian Literature, Iran Culture House, New Delhi, 2012.

External links

   
   

1565 births
1612 deaths
People from Hyderabad district, India
Kings of Golconda
Telugu people
Qutb Shahi dynasty
Urdu-language poets
Year of birth uncertain
1611 in India
1580 in India
Urdu-language writers from Mughal India